The Vermetidae, the worm snails or worm shells, are a taxonomic family of small to medium-sized sea snails, marine gastropod molluscs in the clade Littorinimorpha. The shells of species in the family Vermetidae are extremely irregular, and do not resemble the average snail shell, hence the common name "worm shells" or "worm snails".

These snails usually grow cemented onto a hard surface, or cemented together in colonies.

Shell description
These snails do not have typical regularly coiled gastropod shells; instead, they have very irregular elongated tubular shells which are moulded to, and cemented to, a surface of attachment such as a rock or another shell. In the adult, the apertural part of the shell is usually free, with the opening directed upward.  Some species have an operculum and some do not. Damaged sections of the shell can be sealed off by calcareous septa when necessary.

Some vermetids are solitary, whereas others live in colonies, partially cemented together. The shells of species within this family vary greatly and can sometimes be extremely challenging to identify.

Comparison with annelid worm tubes
The empty calcareous tubes of certain marine annelid tube worms, for example the Serpulidae, can sometimes be casually misidentified as empty vermetid shells, and vice versa. The difference is that vermetid shells are shiny inside and have three shell layers, whereas the annelid worm tubes are dull inside and have only two shell layers.

Taxonomy

2005 taxonomy 
The Vermetidae were recognized as the only family in the superfamily Vermetoidea in the taxonomy of Bouchet & Rocroi (2005) within the clade Littorinimorpha.

The following two subfamilies were recognized in the taxonomy of Bouchet & Rocroi (2005):

Family Vermetidae Rafinesque, 1815
Subfamily Vermetinae Rafinesque, 1815
Subfamily Dendropomatinae Bandel & Kowalke, 1997

This classification of the Vermetoidea has been somewhat controversial. Studies, based on sperm ultrastructure, and on molecular data clearly place it within the clade Littorinimorpha. However, there are still a number of authors that place it within the superfamily Cerithioidea. The genera Campanile and Thylacodes form a clade that is sister to the Cerithioidea, as shown in a study by Lydeard et al. (2002).

2006 taxonomy 
Bandel (2006) established a new subfamily Laxispirinae as one of three subfamilies he recognized within the Vermetidae:

Subfamily Vermetinae Rafinesque, 1815
Subfamily † Laxispirinae Bandel, 2006
Subfamily Dendropomatinae Bandel & Kowalke, 1997

Genera
Genera within the family Vermetidae include:

Vermetinae
 Vermetus Daudin, 1800 - type genus
 Cerithiovermetus Bandel, 2006

†  Laxispirinae
 † Laxispira Gabb, 1877 - Late Cretaceous, type genus of the subfamily

Dendropomatinae
 Dendropoma Mörch, 1861 - type genus of the subfamily

Subfamily ?
Bivonia Gray, 1842: synonym of Dendropoma Mörch, 1861 (junior homonym of Bivonia Cocco, 1832 in Crustacea)
 Ceraesignum Golding, Bieler, Rawlings & T. Collins, 2014
 Cupolaconcha Golding, Bieler, Rawlings & T. M. Collins, 2014
Eualetes Keen, 1971
 Magilina Vélain, 1877
Novastoa Finlay, 1926
Petaloconchus I. Lea, 1843
Spiroglyptus Daudin, 1800
Stephopoma Mörch, 1860
Thylacodes Guettard, 1770, = Serpulorbis Sassi, 1827
 Thylaeodus Mörch, 1860
Tripsycha Keen, 1961
 Vermetidae incertae sedis
 Vermitoma Kuroda, 1928

References

External links 

 Powell A. W. B., New Zealand Mollusca, William Collins Publishers Ltd, Auckland, New Zealand 1979 
 R. Tucker Abbott, 1986. Seashells of North America, St. Martin's Press, New York
 Vaught, K.C. (1989). A classification of the living Mollusca''. American Malacologists: Melbourne, FL (USA). . XII, 195 pp.

 
Taxa named by Constantine Samuel Rafinesque